The House of the Fox (Spanish: La casa de la zorra) is a 1945 Mexican musical comedy film directed by Juan José Ortega. It stars Virginia Fábregas, Isabela Corona, and Alberto Galán.

The film was released on 6 December 1945 at the Palacio cinema.

Plot
A woman nicknamed "La zorra" ("The Fox") runs a gambling house. She welcomes the arrival of her son with great joy. However, "La zorra" learns that her business is on the verge of bankruptcy because of the wasteful spending of her son, who plans to escape and elope with a young woman whom he falls in love with.

Cast
Virginia Fábregas as Señora Adriana / La zorra
Isabela Corona as Nancy
Alberto Galán as Carlos Velasco
Sara Guasch as Isabel Manrique (as Sara Guash)
Susana Guízar as Teresa
Ricardo Montalbán as Alberto Salcedo
Carlos Orellana as Ancona
Andrea Palma as Lucía Velasco
Andrés Soler as Esteban
Julio Villarreal as Don Julio
Manolo Fábregas as Drunk Man at Gambling House
Felipe Montoya as Fernández
Fanny Schiller as Party Guest
Mimí Derba as Ambassador's Wife
Roberto Cañedo as Julio's Employee
Carlos Villarías as Ambassador
Lola Tinoco as Lupe, maid (as Dolores Tinoco)
Estanislao Shilinsky as Drunk Man's Friend (as Schillinsky)
Luis Aceves Castañeda as Man in Gambling House (uncredited)
Daniel Arroyo as Party Guest (uncredited)
Manuel Buendía as Card Dealer (uncredited)
Ricardo Carti as Party Guest (uncredited)
Roberto Corell as French Florist (uncredited)
Ana María Hernández as Party Guest (uncredited)
Héctor Mateos as Man in Gambling House (uncredited)
Rubén Márquez as Man in Gambling House (uncredited)
Daniel Pastor as Héctor, Lucía's son (uncredited)
Ignacio Peón as Bartender (uncredited)
José Luis Rojas as Man in Gambling House (uncredited)
Manuel Trejo Morales as Man in Gambling House (uncredited)
Aurora Zermeño as Alberto's Friend (uncredited)

References

External links
 

1945 films
1945 musical comedy films
Mexican black-and-white films
Mexican musical comedy films
1940s Mexican films